The Oberoi, Dubai is a five star luxury hotel in Business Bay, Dubai, United Arab Emirates.

See also 
 List of buildings in Dubai

References

External links
Emporis

Buildings and structures under construction in Dubai
Skyscraper hotels in Dubai